Lancia is an Italian manufacturer of cars and other vehicles.

Lancia may also refer to:
 Manfred I Lancia (fl. 1160–1214), poet, Margrave of Busca
 Bianca Lancia (1200–1233), consort of Frederick II
 Vincenzo Lancia (1881–1937), Italian engineer, founded the car manufacturer
 Gianni Lancia (1924–2014), Italian automobile engineer, son of Vincenzo Lancia
 Lancia (moth), a genus of moths

See also
 Lancea (disambiguation)
 Lanza (disambiguation)